Maciej Piotr Łasicki (born 12 October 1965 in Gdańsk) is a Polish rower.

References 
 
 

1965 births
Living people
Polish male rowers
Sportspeople from Gdańsk
Rowers at the 1992 Summer Olympics
Olympic bronze medalists for Poland
Olympic rowers of Poland
Olympic medalists in rowing
World Rowing Championships medalists for Poland
Medalists at the 1992 Summer Olympics